Solomon Jamar Hill (born March 18, 1991) is an American professional basketball player who last played for the Atlanta Hawks of the National Basketball Association (NBA). He played college basketball for the Arizona Wildcats.

High school career
Hill attended Fairfax High School in Los Angeles, California. As a junior, he averaged 10.7 points and 8.7 rebounds per game. As a senior, he averaged 16.2 points, 11.7 rebounds and 5.1 assists per game. He finished his career as a two-time Los Angeles All-City selection and a third team all-state pick in 2009.

Considered a four-star recruit by Rivals.com, Hill was listed as the No. 3 small forward and the No. 27 player in the nation in 2009.

College career
In his freshman season at Arizona, he was a steady contributor for the Wildcats both starting and off the bench. In 31 games (21 starts), he averaged 6.7 points, 4.4 rebounds and 1.7 assists in 25.3 minutes per game.

In his sophomore season, he was one of just three Wildcats to start every game. He was named to iBN Sports Las Vegas Invitational all-tournament team after averaging 11.0 points, 4.8 rebounds and 2.8 assists in event's four games. Head coach Sean Miller called Hill Arizona's most improved player in 2010–11. In 38 games (all starts), he averaged 8.0 points, 4.7 rebounds and 1.7 assists in 25.2 minutes per game.

In his junior season, he was named to the All-Pac-12 first team, the NABC All-District 20 first team and the Pacific Life Pac-12 All-Tournament team. He was also named Arizona's Most Outstanding Player by the coaching staff. In 35 games (all starts), he averaged 12.9 points, 7.7 rebounds, 2.6 assists and 1.0 steals in 32.4 minutes per game.

In his senior season, he was named to the All-Pac-12 first team and the NABC All-District 20 first team for the second straight year. He was also a USBWA all-District IX first team honoree and the winner of the Sapphire Award, given to Arizona's male athlete of the year. In 35 games (all starts), he averaged 13.4 points, 5.3 rebounds, 2.7 assists and 1.1 steals in 33.0 minutes per game. In December 2012, he was awarded the MVP of the 2012 Diamond Head Classic after averaging 12.0 points, 5.0 rebounds and 2.3 assists in the three games.

Professional career

Indiana Pacers (2013–2016)
On June 27, 2013, Hill was selected with the 23rd overall pick by the Indiana Pacers in the 2013 NBA draft. On July 3, he signed his rookie scale contract with the Pacers and joined the team for the 2013 NBA Summer League. On December 29, 2013, he was assigned to the Fort Wayne Mad Ants. On January 4, 2014, he was recalled by the Pacers. On April 16, 2014, in the final regular season game, he played a season-high 28 minutes and pulled down a career-best five rebounds to go with five points on 2-for-6 shooting (1–2 3FG) in a win over the Orlando Magic. He appeared in 28 games during the 2013–14 regular season, posting averages of 1.7 points and 1.5 rebounds in 7.9 minutes per game.

An off-season right ankle injury forced Hill to miss the 2014 NBA Summer League. On October 9, 2014, the Pacers exercised their third-year team option on Hill's rookie scale contract, extending the contract through the 2015–16 season. On November 8, 2014, he scored a career-high 28 points in a 97–90 loss to the Washington Wizards. A week later, he recorded 21 points and a career-high 12 rebounds in a 99–90 win over the Chicago Bulls. Hill appeared in all 82 games for the Pacers in 2014–15, as the team missed the playoffs with a 38–44 win–loss record. Serving as the Pacers' starting small forward with Paul George out injured for most of the season, Hill managed 78 starts and finished with averages of 8.9 points, 3.8 rebounds and 2.2 assists in 29.0 minutes per game.

In July 2015, Hill re-joined the Pacers for the 2015 NBA Summer League. He shot poorly in three summer league games, going 18.2% from the field for a 4.7-point-per-game average. Hill's role and production decreased dramatically in 2015–16 thanks to the return of Paul George to full health. He scored in double figures just three times over the first five months of the season before scoring a then season-high 15 points on April 6, 2016 in a 123–109 win over the Eastern Conference-leading Cleveland Cavaliers. Four days later, he recorded his first double-double of the season with 13 points and 12 rebounds in a 129–103 win over the Brooklyn Nets. In the Pacers' regular season finale on April 13, Hill scored a season-high 25 points and went a career-best 7-of-11 from three-point range in a 97–92 win over the Milwaukee Bucks.

New Orleans Pelicans (2016–2019)
On July 21, 2016, Hill signed a four-year deal with the New Orleans Pelicans. On February 15, 2017, he scored a then season-high 23 points in a 95–91 win over the Memphis Grizzlies. On March 17, 2017, he scored a career-high 30 points in a 128–112 win over the Houston Rockets. Hill was averaging just 6.5 points per game coming in, having spent most of the season focused on defense.

On August 27, 2017, Hill underwent surgery to repair a torn hamstring. He made his season debut on March 18, 2018, against the Boston Celtics. He played eight minutes and finished with one assist in a 108–89 win.

Memphis Grizzlies (2019–2020)
On July 6, 2019, Hill, the draft rights to De’Andre Hunter and Jordan Bone and a conditional 2023 second-round pick, were traded to the Atlanta Hawks for the draft rights to Jaxson Hayes, Nickeil Alexander-Walker and Marcos Louzada Silva, plus a conditional 2020 first-round pick. The next day, the Hawks traded him alongside Miles Plumlee to the Memphis Grizzlies for Chandler Parsons.

Miami Heat (2020)
On February 6, 2020, Hill was traded to the Miami Heat in a 3-team trade. The Heat reached the 2020 NBA Finals, before losing in 6 games to the Los Angeles Lakers.

Atlanta Hawks (2020–2022)
On November 25, 2020, Hill signed with the Atlanta Hawks.

On August 5, 2021, Hill re-signed with the Hawks. On December 5, 2021, he suffered a torn hamstring tendon in a 130–127 loss to the Charlotte Hornets. On December 8, it was confirmed to be a season-ending injury.

On January 13, 2022, the Hawks traded Hill, along with Cam Reddish, a 2025 second round draft pick and cash considerations, to the New York Knicks in exchange for Kevin Knox and a protected future first round pick. On January 19, he was waived by the Knicks.

NBA career statistics

Regular season

|-
| style="text-align:left;"|
| style="text-align:left;"|Indiana
| 28 || 0 || 8.1 || .425 || .304 || .857 || 1.5 || .4 || .2 || .1 || 1.7
|-
| style="text-align:left;"|
| style="text-align:left;"|Indiana
| 82 || 78 || 29.0 || .396 || .327 || .824 || 3.8 || 2.2 || .8 || .2 || 8.9
|-
| style="text-align:left;"|
| style="text-align:left;"|Indiana
| 59 || 3 || 14.7 || .447 || .324 || .857 || 2.8 || 1.0 || .6 || .2 || 4.2
|-
| style="text-align:left;"|
| style="text-align:left;"|New Orleans
| 80 || 71 || 29.7 || .383 || .348 || .805 || 3.8 || 1.8 || .9 || .4 || 7.0
|-
| style="text-align:left;"|
| style="text-align:left;"|New Orleans
| 12 || 1 || 15.6 || .268 || .190 || .500 || 3.0 || 1.8 || .6 || .1 || 2.4
|-
| style="text-align:left;"|
| style="text-align:left;"|New Orleans
| 44 || 15 || 20.0 || .382 || .317 || .719 || 3.0 || 1.3 || .5 || .2 || 4.3
|-
| style="text-align:left;"|
| style="text-align:left;"|Memphis
| 48 || 3 || 18.8 || .412 || .381 || .684 || 3.0 || 2.0 || .6 || .1 || 5.7
|-
| style="text-align:left;"|
| style="text-align:left;"|Miami
| 11 || 1 || 17.0 || .311 || .292 || .875 || 1.9 || .9 || 1.1 || .5 || 4.5
|-
| style="text-align:left;"|
| style="text-align:left;"|Atlanta
| 71 || 16 || 21.3 || .359 || .321 || .761 || 3.0 || 1.1 || .7 || .2 || 4.5
|-
| style="text-align:left;"|
| style="text-align:left;"|Atlanta
| 13 || 1 || 10.7 || .150 || .154 ||  || 1.8 || .9 || .3 || .2 || .6
|-
| style="text-align:center;" colspan="2"|Career
| 448 || 189 || 21.5 || .388 || .331 || .797 || 3.1 || 1.5 || .7 || .2 || 5.5

Playoffs

|-
| style="text-align:left;"|2014
| style="text-align:left;"|Indiana
| 1 || 0 || 1.0 ||  ||  ||  || .0 || .0 || .0 || .0 || .0
|-
| style="text-align:left;"|2016
| style="text-align:left;"|Indiana
| 7 || 0 || 28.3 || .452 || .579 || .938 || 4.0 || 1.1 || .3 || .0 || 7.7
|-
| style="text-align:left;"|2018
| style="text-align:left;"|New Orleans
| 9 || 0 || 12.7 || .360 || .375 || .900 || 1.9 || .8 || .1 || .1 || 3.7
|-
| style="text-align:left;"|2020
| style="text-align:left;"|Miami
| 7 || 0 || 6.0 || .556 || .333 ||  || 1.0 || .4 || .1 || .0 || 1.7
|-
| style="text-align:left;"|2021
| style="text-align:left;"|Atlanta
| 14 || 3 || 10.4 || .250 || .167 || .500 || 1.4 || .1 || .1 || .0 || 1.2
|-
| style="text-align:center;" colspan="2"|Career
| 38 || 3 || 13.2 || .382 || .373 || .867 || 1.9 || .6 || .2 || .1 || 3.1

References

External links

1991 births
Living people
American men's basketball players
Arizona Wildcats men's basketball players
Atlanta Hawks players
Basketball players from Los Angeles
Fort Wayne Mad Ants players
Indiana Pacers draft picks
Indiana Pacers players
Memphis Grizzlies players
Miami Heat players
New Orleans Pelicans players
Small forwards